Marcel Spatari (born 13 August 1981) was the Minister of Labour and Social Protection of the Republic of Moldova from August 2021 to January 2023 in the Gavrilița Cabinet.

Note

1981 births
Living people
Politicians from Chișinău
Government ministers of Moldova